Elections for 16 of the 33 seats in Tennessee's State Senate was held on November 3, 2020, along with the Presidential, U.S. Senate, U.S. House, and State House elections. During this election, Republicans lost District 20, which is in the outskirts of Nashville.

Primary elections were held on August 6, 2020, with the exception of presidential primaries held on March 3 of that year.

Retirements
One incumbent did not run for re-election in 2020. That incumbent is:

Republicans
District 26: Dolores Gresham: Retiring

Incumbents defeated

In the general election

Republicans
District 20: Steven Dickerson lost to Heidi Campbell.

Predictions

Results summary

Close races
Two races were decided by a margin of under 10%:

Overview

Detailed results by State Senate District

District 2

Republican primary

General election

District 4

Republican primary

Democratic primary

General election

District 6

Republican primary

Democratic primary

General election

District 8

Republican primary

General election

District 10

Republican primary

Democratic primary

General election

District 12

Republican primary

General election

District 14

Republican primary

Democratic primary

General election

District 16

Republican primary

Democratic primary

General election

District 18

Republican primary

General election

District 20

Republican primary

Democratic primary

Polling

General election

District 22

Republican primary

Democratic primary

General election

District 24

Republican primary

General election

District 26

Republican primary

Democratic primary

General election

District 28

Republican primary

General election

District 30

Democratic primary

General election

District 32

Republican primary

Democratic primary

General election

Notes 

Partisan clients

References

External links
 
 
  (State affiliate of the U.S. League of Women Voters)
 

Senate
Tennessee Senate
Tennessee Senate elections